Three finger may refer to:

Arts and entertainment
"Three Fingers", a song from the Buckethead album Enter the Chicken
Three Fingered Jenny, a 1916 American silent short mystery directed by Edward LeSaint and written by Harvey Gates
A character in the film series Wrong Turn
Scruggs style, a banjo style also known as three-finger style

Geography
Three Fingers (Washington), a prominent mountain in the Northern Cascades in Washington, United States
Three Finger Lake, in Halifax Regional Municipality, Nova Scotia, Canada
Three Fingered Jack, a Pleistocene volcano in the Cascade Range of Oregon, United States
Three Fingers Lookout, historic fire observation building

People
Mordecai Brown, nicknamed "Three Finger" or "Miner", American Major League Baseball pitcher
William White (gangster), "Three Fingers", a Prohibition gangster and member of the Chicago Outfit
Robert H. Birch, Robert H. "Three-Fingered" Birch, a 19th-century American adventurer, soldier and prospector
Three Fingered Jack (Jamaica), leader of slave runaways
Three Finger Brice, American baseballer
Tommy Lucchese, Italian-American gangster

Salutes

Three-finger salute (Serbian), a salute used by Serbs
Three-finger salute (Sicilian), a salute used by Sicilian nationalists and separatists
Three-finger salute (pro-democracy), a gesture originally from the Hunger Games books and films and later used in protests in Myanmar and Thailand
Three-finger salute, a jocular term for the three-key command Control-Alt-Delete
Scout sign and salute, the salute of the World Scouting Movement

Other uses 
Three-toed sloth, an animal species
Three-finger toxin, a toxin protein
Control-Alt-Delete, a jocular term for the three key combination that causes an operating system interrupt
Sign of the cross, a blessing gesture also known as three finger cross

See also 
 Third Finger, Left Hand (disambiguation)
 Third finger